Rhopilema is a genus of jellyfish.

Species include:
 Rhopilema esculentum ("Bizen kurage") Kishinouye 1891
 Rhopilema hispidum ("Hizen kurage") Vanhoffen 1888
 Rhopilema nomadica, (Indo-Pacific nomadic jellyfish) a dangerously venomous Indo-Pacific species recently introduced to the Mediterranean Sea
 Rhopilema rhopalophorum Haeckel, 1880 Rhopilema rhopalophora is a synonym.
 Rhopilema verrilli

References

External links
 
 

Rhizostomatidae
Scyphozoan genera
Taxa named by Ernst Haeckel